The 1985–86 season was Burnley's first season in the fourth tier of English football. They were initially managed by Martin Buchan until October 1985, when he was replaced by Tommy Cavanagh as manager.

Appearances and goals

|}

Matches

Football League Division Four
Key

In Result column, Burnley's score shown first
H = Home match
A = Away match

pen. = Penalty kick
o.g. = Own goal

Results

Final league position

FA Cup

League Cup

Football League Trophy

References

Burnley F.C. seasons
Burnley